Captain William Newton Lancaster (14 February 1898 – 20 April 1933) was a pioneering British aviator.

Early life
Born in Birmingham, England, Lancaster emigrated to Australia prior to World War I. In 1916, he joined first the Australian Army and later the Australian Flying Corps. He remained in Britain after the war and joined the Royal Air Force, marrying Annie Maude Besant in 1919 and serving in India during the 1920s. He was promoted to flying officer from pilot officer on 30 April 1921.

England to Australia
In 1927, Lancaster transferred to the RAF Reserve (he continued to hold a commission until 30 April 1930), and decided to make a name for himself by flying from England to Australia.  He made this flight in the Avro Avian Red Rose, accompanied by Australian Jessie "Chubbie" Miller, who helped finance the flight. It was at the time one of the longest flights made in such a small aircraft—although they were overtaken en route by Bert Hinkler in another Avian—and the first England–Australia flight by a woman. A huge crowd greeted them on arrival in Darwin, and on their subsequent tour around Australia.

In 1928 Lancaster and Miller moved to the United States on the promise of a Hollywood movie which was never made. Lancaster then made a living selling British aero engines, and Miller became an aviator in her own right, competing in the famous "Powder Puff Derby" of 1929.

Murder trial
In 1932, Lancaster had been in Mexico looking for work. At the same time, Haden Clarke, a male American writer, had been living in Lancaster and Miller's Florida home in order to assist Miller's writing of her autobiography. Clarke and Miller had developed a relationship in Lancaster's absence, and Clarke convinced Miller to leave Lancaster and marry him instead. Upon receipt of this news, Lancaster returned promptly to Florida.

On 20 April, Clarke was killed by a gunshot wound to the head. Despite that the gun was Lancaster's, and that he admitted forging suicide notes found at the scene (one addressed to Lancaster and another to Miller), forensic evidence provided by the prosecution was confusing to the jury.

Albert H. Hamilton, a criminologist with a somewhat dubious past, provided easy-to-understand testimony in Lancaster's favour. Additionally, even though Lancaster and Miller had dissolved their romance and partnership, Miller spoke in Lancaster's defence and the trial judge gave a summing up in his favour.

Lancaster was acquitted of murder after 5 hours of deliberation. It is regarded that although the evidence was in doubt, a main factor in Lancaster's acquittal was his calm, straightforward, gentlemanly demeanor in the courtroom; and the portrayal of the victim as depressive, drug-addicted and suicidal. Public opinion may also have played its part in influencing the jury; indeed, at one point the behaviour of those in gallery became so unruly (cheering for Lancaster), that Judge Atkinson interrupted with a firm, "This is not a vaudeville show!"

Final flight

After the trial, Lancaster and Miller returned to England. Broke and friendless, Lancaster decided to attempt the hotly contested England-to-South Africa speed record. Purchasing the Avro Avian Southern Cross Minor from Charles Kingsford Smith, he departed England on 11 April 1933. As the Avian was considerably slower than other aircraft of the time, Lancaster would have to make very short stops and get very little sleep to have any hope of achieving the record.

Having got lost several times, having not slept for 30 hours and being ten hours behind his intended time, Lancaster departed from Reggane on the evening of 12 April to make a  night crossing of the Sahara. The Avian's engine failed after less than an hour's flying, and he crash-landed in the desert far north of his expected flight path. Relatively uninjured and occasionally firing flares he awaited rescue. Searches by aircraft, however, were too far to the south, and a car searching from Reggane was also unsuccessful. He died eight days later, on 20 April 1933, exactly one year after Clarke's death. His final message, written on a fuel card on the morning of the 20th, was "So the beginning of the eighth day has dawned. It is still cool. I have no water. I am waiting patiently. Come soon please. Fever wracked me last night. Hope you get my full log. Bill"

Discovery
The crash site was discovered by French troops on 12 February 1962, approximately 170 miles south of Reggane in the Tanezrouft region. Lancaster's body had been mummified, and his diary and personal effects had survived intact.  The diary was returned to Miller, who allowed it to be published. Lancaster was buried in Algeria.

The wreck of the Southern Cross Minor was recovered in 1975. It now resides in the Queensland Museum in Brisbane but is now held in storage and no longer on public display.

Popular culture
A TV miniseries called The Lancaster Miller Affair was made in Australia in 1985.

A season two episode titled "The Lost Desert Flyer" of the documentary TV series Vanishings!  first aired in 2004.

The 2009 movie The Last Flight by Karim Dridi is based on the French novel Le dernier vol de Lancaster by Sylvain Estibal, which is loosely based on the real-life events surrounding the disappearance of Bill Lancaster.

In 2014 Andrew Lancaster premiered his 90min family documentary The Lost Aviator which challenges the Lancaster family as to whether Bill Lancaster was guilty of murder in Miami 1931.

In 2017, Carol Baxter's book The Fabulous Flying Mrs Miller: an Australian's true story of adventure, danger, romance and murder, which tells Bill and Chubbie's story, was published by Allen & Unwin, Sydney.

References

1898 births
1933 deaths
Australian aviators
Australian military personnel of World War I
Aviators killed in aviation accidents or incidents
British aviators
People acquitted of murder
Royal Air Force officers
Victims of aviation accidents or incidents in Algeria
Victims of aviation accidents or incidents in 1933